Amiantofusus gloriabundus is a species of sea snail, a marine gastropod mollusc in the family Fasciolariidae, the spindle snails, the tulip snails and their allies.

Description
Large spiraling shells, often grey or mottled red in color, sometimes with curved white sections on the shells of elder males. Small spines or protrusions on the shell are common at specific points.

Distribution

Amiantofusus gloriabundus is mainly found in temperate shallow waters off the coast of South America or Indonesia and other parts of the South Pacific. They are also found in cooler seas off the coast of India because of the food rich waters there.

References

External links
  Fraussen K., Kantor Y. & Hadorn R. 2007. Amiantofusus gen. nov. for Fusus amiantus Dall, 1889 (Mollusca: Gastropoda: Fasciolariidae) with description of a new and extensive Indo-West Pacific radiation. Novapex 8 (3–4): 79–101

Fasciolariidae
Gastropods described in 2007